Reticulolaelaps is a genus of mites in the family Laelapidae.

Species
 Reticulolaelaps faini Costa, 1968     
 Reticulolaelaps lativentris Karg, 1978

References

Laelapidae